CSipSimple is a Voice over Internet Protocol (VoIP) application for Google Android operating system using the Session Initiation Protocol (SIP). It is open source and free software released under the GPL-3.0-or-later license.

The project was abandoned in October 2017. As of 26 May 2019, CSIP no longer has an active website and is no longer available on the Play Store. Users with CSip already installed did not have the app removed from their device.

Details
It relies on the PJSIP SIP stack and get features provided by this SIP stack.

The key features of this software are:
 Multi-codec support: Speex (narrow-band/wide-band), G.711 (u-law/a-law), GSM, iLBC, G.729 (support dropped with r2180, need to buy a licensed g729 plug-in), G.722, AMR (narrow-band), iSAC, SILK (narrow-band/wide-band/ultra wide-band) (support dropped in 2014)
 A plug-in adds support for Codec2, G.726, G.722.1 and Opus
 A plug-in adds video calling with VP8, H264 and H263-1998 codecs
 Multi-account support: up to 10 accounts can be activated at the same time
 Can use native audio driver
 NAT traversal using STUN, TURN and ICE
 Integration with Android operating system with filters and rewriting rules
 Security and encryption with SRTP, SIP over TLS 1.0 and ZRTP
 SIP SIMPLE messaging
 An API for third-party applications is available
 Packet loss concealment (PLC) using PJSIP
 Support for IPv6 – If the hardware, Android version, ISP and all other parts of the connections involved can handle IPv6, then Csipsimple can be used to make direct end-to-end ipv6-to-ipv6 calls.

Reviews
, reviews are favourable.

See also

 Comparison of VoIP software
 List of SIP software
 Mobile VoIP

References

Free and open-source Android software
Free VoIP software
Cryptographic software
Internet privacy
Secure communication
Android (operating system) software